The 2020–21 Iowa State Cyclones men's basketball team represented Iowa State University during the 2020–21 NCAA Division I men's basketball season. The Cyclones were led by Steve Prohm, who coached his sixth and final season at Iowa State. They played their home games at Hilton Coliseum in Ames, Iowa as members of the Big 12 Conference.

The Cyclones would suffer through a COVID-19-plagued 2–22 record, including an 0–18 mark in Big 12 play, the first team to go winless through the Big 12 since TCU in 2014. They lost in the First Round of the Big 12 tournament to Oklahoma. Following the end of the season, ISU athletic director Jamie Pollard announced that the school and Prohm had parted ways.

Previous season
The Cyclones finished the 2019–20 season 12–20, 5–13 in Big 12 play to finish in ninth place. They lost to Oklahoma State in the first round of the Big 12 Conference tournament. They were one of the few major conference teams in the country to complete a full season before play was halted nationally due to the COVID-19 pandemic.

Offseason

Departures

Incoming transfers

2020 recruiting class

2021 Recruiting class

Roster

}

Schedule and results 
This is the first season that Big 12 Now on ESPN+ will air a number of non-conference home games. On April 22, 2020, it was reported that Iowa State would face DePaul as part of the Big 12-Big East Alliance. It was later announced on June 9 that Iowa State would face Oregon in the semifinal round of the Emerald Coast Classic. On October 5, the tournament was canceled due to the ongoing COVID-19 pandemic.

Due to the ongoing coronavirus pandemic, the start of the season will be pushed back from the scheduled start of November 10. On September 16, the NCAA announced that November 25 would be the new start date.

On November 9, Iowa State announced their home, non-conference schedule. On December 6, 2020, the home contest with DePaul was canceled an hour before tipoff.
|-
!colspan=12 style=| Regular Season

|-
!colspan=12 style=| Big 12 Tournament

References 

Iowa State Cyclones men's basketball seasons
Iowa State